Amarna letter EA 325, titled: "Preparations Completed (2)," is a shorter-length clay tablet Amarna letter from Yidya the governor-'mayor' of Ašqaluna-(Ashkelon). It is a letter addressing the Pharaoh in high terms, as well as stating the 'governor of Ašqaluna' is making preparations for the arrival of the Pharaoh's archer-army, the archers (Egyptian pitati). EA 325 is a vassal-state letter (from Canaan), and has some similar appearances, for example appearing like letters EA 270 and EA 271.

The letter

EA 325: "Preparations Completed (2),"
EA 325, letter five of seven, by Yidya. (Not a linear, line-by-line translation, and English from French.)

(Lines 1-9)--[To] the king, my lord, my god, my Sun, the Sun fr[om the s]ky; Message of Yidya, your servant, the dirt at your feet, the groom of [yo]ur horses. I indeed prostrate myself, on the back and on the stomach, at the feet of the king, my lord, 7 times and 7 times.
(10-14)--I am indeed guarding the place of the king, my lord, and the city of the king, my lord, [w]here I am. Who is the dog that would not obey the orders of the king, the Sun from the sky?
(15-19)--I have indeed prepared absolutely everything — [f]ood, strong drink, oxen, sheep, and goats,1 grain, straw, absolutely everything that the king, my lord, commanded. I have indeed prepared it.
(20-22)--And I am indeed p[reparing] the tribute of the Sun, in accordance with the comma[nd] of the king, my lord, the Sun fr[om the sky].

Akkadian text
The Akkadian language text:

Akkadian:

(Line 1)--A-na 1.diš-LUGAL-EN-ia dingir-MEŠ-IA--(–1–: LUGAL-,.. -MEŠ-,..) 
(2)--dingir-UTU-IA dingir-UTU ša iš-tu [ an-ša10-mi ]--(-UTU-,.. -UTU ša  -ša10-mi!...) 
(3)--umma 1.diš-(pi=yi)-YI-iD-(i)Ya ARAD-ka--(–1,– Yi--,.. ,...)
(4)--ip-ri ša 2.diš-GÌR-MEŠ-ka--(.. ša 2(1-1).-GÌR-MEŠ-,...)
(5)--LÚ qar-tab-bi ša 2.diš ANŠE.KUR.RA.MEŠ-ka--(.. qar--- ša 2.-ANŠE--RA-MEŠ-,...)
(6)--ana 2.diš-GÌR-MEŠ LUGAL-EN-ia am-qú-ut--( 2.-GÌR-MEŠ,.. LUGAL-,.. -qú-ut!... )
(7)--7.diš-šu ù 7.diš-ta-na--(7.-,.. ú 7,.. -,.. ) 
(8)--lu-ú iš-tu-hu-hi-in--(lu-ú,.. --hu-hi-in!...)
(9)--ṣi-ru-ma ù ka-ba-tu-ma
segue:
(single line ruling)(=paragraph)
(10)--a-nu-ma i-na-ṣa-ru a-šar
(11)--LUGAL-EN-ia ù URU-ki LUGAL-EN-ia
(12)--ša it-ti-ia mi-la-mi
(13)--lu-ú-ur-gi12 ù la-a (pi=yi) yi-iš-te-mu
(14)--a-wa-ti7 LUGAL dingir-UTU iš-tu an- { ša10-mi }
segue:
(single line ruling)(=paragraph)
(15)--a-nu-ma šu-ši-ir-ti gáb-bi mi-im-mi
(16)--[ NÌG-]-MEŠ KAŠ-MEŠ (gu4)GUD-MEŠ ud5-MEŠ
(17)--ŠE-MEŠ IN-MEŠ gáb-bi mi-im-[ mi ]

English:
(Line 1)--(To:.. 1.-King-Lord-Mine,.. (of) Gods (pl)-Mine,.. )
(2)--(God-'Sun-God'-Mine,.. God 'Sun-God' 'which' from "Sky" (Heaven),.. )
(3)--('message thus' 1.-Yi-iD-iYa(Yidya),.. Servant-Yours,.. )
(4)--(dust,.. 'which at' 2.-feet (pl)-yours,.. )
(5)--((the) Groom,.. 'which of' 2.-Horses(pl)-Yours,.. )
(6)--(at 2. Feet (pl),.. King-Lord-Mine,.. (I) bow!... )
(7)--(7. times and 7, times,.. )
(8)--("may it be",.. (that I) prostrate (myself),.. )
(9)--((on my) Back and Front (liver),.. )
segue:

See also
Yidya
Ashkelon
Amarna letter EA 323
Archers (Egyptian pitati)
Amarna letters–phrases and quotations

External links
Photo, EA 325: Obverse (Middle clay-tablet)
Triplet Photo (British Museum), EA 324, EA 323, & EA 325: Obverse photos
Line Drawing, cuneiform, and Akkadian, EA 325: Obverse & Reverse, CDLI no. P270937 (Chicago Digital Library Initiative)

References

Moran, William L. The Amarna Letters. Johns Hopkins University Press, 1987, 1992. (softcover)
 Parpola, 1971. The Standard Babylonian Epic of Gilgamesh, Parpola, Simo, Neo-Assyrian Text Corpus Project, c 1997, Tablet I thru Tablet XII, Index of Names, Sign List, and Glossary-(pp. 119–145), 165 pages.

Amarna letters
Ashkelon
Canaan